The Albion Britons football program is a college football team that represents Albion College in the Michigan Intercollegiate Athletic Association, a part of the Division III (NCAA).  The team has had 26 head coaches since its first recorded football game in 1883. The current coach is Dustin Beurer who took the position for the 2019 season.

Key

Coaches

Notes

References

Albion

Michigan sports-related lists